Ahmet Ali Çelikten (born İzmirli Alioğlu Ahmed; 1883 – 1969), also known as İzmirli Ahmet Ali (English: Ahmet Ali from Izmir), was a Turkish aviator, of Afro-Turkish ethnicity, regarded as the first black pilot in history. He was one of the first black males becoming a fighter pilot, receiving his “wings” in 1914. Ahmet's maternal grandmother was born in Bornu (now in Nigeria) and was brought to what is now Turkey as part of the Ottoman slave trade.

Biography
Ahmet was born in 1883 in Izmir (ancient Smyrna), in the Aidin Vilayet of the Ottoman Empire. His mother, Zenciye Emine Hanım, was of Nigerian descent; his father, Ali Bey, was also Afro-Turkish. The Family flew from Cairo, Egypt to Crete because Egypt was occupied by the French in the Years 1798-1801, they moved from Crete to Izmir. He aimed to become a sailor and entered the Naval Technical School Haddehâne Mektebi (literally "School of the Blooming Mill") in 1904. In 1908, he graduated from this school as a First Lieutenant (Mülâzım-ı evvel). And then he went to aviation courses in the Naval Flight School (Deniz Tayyare Mektebi), formed on 25 June 1914 at Yeşilköy. He was then a member of the Ottoman Air Force. 

During World War I, he married Hatice Hanım (1897–1991) who was a Turkish war immigrant from Preveza.

He became one of the first black military pilots in aviation history in 11.November 1916. on 14 February 1917, Ahmed Ali was made a Captain (Yüzbaşı) and sent to Berlin 18.Dezember 1917 to complete aviation courses. Following the completion of these courses, he was assigned to the Izmir Naval Aircraft Company. His Code Name was "Celik Kara Kartal" - Black Eagle of Steel, derived from his name.

Following the end of World War I, Ahmed Ali became involved with the Turkish War of Independence and supported the Turkish National Movement. He volunteered his services as a pilot at the Konya Military Air Base, in Konya, Turkey. At this time, Turkish Nationalists enacted a plan to steal airplanes from Ottoman warehouses and bring them to Amasra, a port town on the Black Sea. Ahmed  was sent to Amasra in 1922 in order to assist with this operation. Pilots utilized these airplanes to monitor the Black Sea and protect their naval operations.

Upon the establishment of the Republic of Turkey in 1923, a division was created to move aviation operations from Konya to Izmir. Ahmed was assigned to this division and continued his service in Izmir. In 1928, he was appointed to the Air Undersecretariat, a division of the Turkish Air Force which operated under the Ministry of National Defense.  He was Honored by the "Türkiye Cumhuriyeti Istiklal Madalyasi" (Independence Medal) with the Nr: 480 in 1924 by Mustafa Kemal Atatürk - and Ismet Inönü for his  bravery in the Türkish Independence War. 

Ahmed Ali retired in 1949 as Türk Hava Kuvvetleri Albayi (Colonel) the Turkish Air Force, after his pension he devoted his time to his family and led a secluded life. He died in 24. June 1969 in Izmir, Turkey. Ahmet Ali´s grandchildren are widely active in the Aviation Industry in Turkey, they live in Izmir.

Legacy
To quote David Nicolle's book, The Ottoman Army 1904–1918, "Most Ottoman aircrew were recruited from the Turkish heartland ... others came from the Arab provinces of the Ottoman Empire as far south as Yemen, or even from neutral Iran. Captain Ahmet was a mix of Arab-African and Turkish origin and may have been the first 'Black' Air Force pilot in aviation history, having received his 'wings' in 1914-15." The book features a photo of Ahmet in front of a Bleriot XI-2 trainer at the Yeşilköy flying school. The same photo is featured in "Over the Front", Volume 9, No. 3, Fall 1994. Ahmet's "wings" would seem to have been earned prior to Bullard's earning his brevet No. 6259 on 20 July 1917, though Bullard is often cited as history's first black military aviator.

Gallery

References

Further reading
David Nicolle, The Ottoman Army 1914-1918, Osprey, Men-at-Arms Series, 1994.

External links
"Dünyanın ilk siyah pilotu: Arap Ahmet" (World's first Black pilot), NTVMSNBC, 7 March 2011. 
"Dünyanın ilk siyah pilotu: Arap Ahmet", photo gallery in the website of Sabah. 

1883 births
1969 deaths
People from İzmir
People from Aidin vilayet
Turkish people of Nigerian descent
Aviators from the Ottoman Empire
Aviation pioneers
Turkish aviators
Naval aviators
Ottoman Navy officers
Ottoman military personnel of World War I
World War I pilots from the Ottoman Empire
Military aviation in the Ottoman Empire
Turkish military personnel of the Turkish War of Independence
Turkish Navy officers
Nigerian people of World War I
Black aviators